The Emilia-Romagna regional election of 1970 took place on 7–8 June 1970.

The Italian Communist Party was by far the largest party and, after the election, Communist Guido Fanti formed a government with the support of the Italian Socialist Party.

Results

Elections in Emilia-Romagna
1970 elections in Italy